Thamnea is a genus of flowering plants belonging to the family Bruniaceae.

Its native range is South African Republic.

Species:

Thamnea depressa 
Thamnea gracilis 
Thamnea hirtella 
Thamnea massoniana 
Thamnea matroosbergensis 
Thamnea teres 
Thamnea thesioides 
Thamnea uniflora 
Thamnea ustulata

References

Bruniaceae
Asterid genera
Taxa named by Adolphe-Théodore Brongniart
Taxa named by Daniel Solander